Palermo is an unincorporated community in Doniphan County, Kansas, United States.

History
A post office was opened in Palermo in 1855, and remained in operation until it was discontinued in 1904.

References

Further reading

External links
 Doniphan County maps: Current, Historic, KDOT

Unincorporated communities in Doniphan County, Kansas
Unincorporated communities in Kansas
1855 establishments in Kansas Territory